The Telia Ladies Finale was a women's professional golf tournament on the Swedish Golf Tour played annually from 1997 to 2007 in September or October as the season finale. The final installment was held at the newly opened Hills Golf Club in Gothenburg, Sweden.

The event was discontinued after the tour changed its main sponsor from Telia to SAS in 2008.

Winners

References

Swedish Golf Tour (women) events